Tyler Ruthven (born July 18, 1988) is a former American soccer player.

Career

College and amateur
Ruthven attended Roswell High School and Milton High School and played club soccer for the Concorde Fire Elite, before beginning his college soccer career at the University of San Francisco. He transferred to the University of South Carolina as a sophomore in 2007, where he received numerous awards and accolades, being named Conference USA Newcomer of the Year and to the All-Conference USA Third Team and the NSCAA All-South Third Team in 2007, and collecting First-Team All-Conference USA honors and being named to the NSCAA All-South Third Team as a senior.

During his college years Ruthven also played in the USL Premier Development League with Colorado Rapids U23's and Chicago Fire Premier.

Professional
Ruthven turned professional in 2010 when he signed with the Harrisburg City Islanders of the USL Second Division. He made his professional debut on July 3, 2010 in a game against the Charlotte Eagles, and scored his first professional goal on July 10 in a 3–2 victory over the Real Maryland Monarchs.

Ruthven signed with Atlanta Silverbacks of the North American Soccer League on March 7, 2011. Ruthven earned his first league honors on July 26, 2011 winning the NASL Defensive Player of the Week. He re-signed with Atlanta on January 30, 2012, but was allowed to go on trial with New York Red Bulls.

On March 5, 2012 Ruthven agreed to terms with the New York Red Bulls of Major League Soccer after impressing during his trial stint. His first appearance in MLS came in the second half of the April 22, 2012 match against D.C. United. Ruthven then started the club's next three matches, helping New York to three consecutive clean sheets (all 1-0 victories). On November 19, 2012, the Red Bulls announced it declined options for an additional 6 players, having released 4 a week earlier, with Ruthven included in the mix. In 2013, he rejoined the New York Red Bulls during preseason and earned a contract. However, the contract was revoked before the 2013 season began.

On March 28, 2013, Ruthven agreed to terms with IK Brage of Superettan after impressing the team's sport director Michael Kallback.

After becoming a regular in the lineup the first half of the season with IK Brage, the club ran into some difficulties and Ruthven left on a free transfer during the summer window to KuPS in Finland.

On October 1, 2019, after two seasons with USL Championship side Atlanta United 2, Ruthven announced he would retire from playing professional soccer.

Personal
He is the son of former Major League Baseball pitcher Dick Ruthven.

References

External links
 South Carolina Gamecocks bio

1988 births
Living people
American soccer players
American expatriate soccer players
Association football defenders
Atlanta Silverbacks players
Atlanta United 2 players
Chicago Fire U-23 players
Colorado Rapids U-23 players
Expatriate footballers in Sweden
Expatriate footballers in Finland
IK Brage players
Jacksonville Armada FC players
Kuopion Palloseura players
Major League Soccer players
Miami FC players
New York Red Bulls players
North American Soccer League players
Penn FC players
People from Alpharetta, Georgia
Phoenix Rising FC players
San Francisco Dons men's soccer players
Soccer players from Georgia (U.S. state)
South Carolina Gamecocks men's soccer players
Sportspeople from Fulton County, Georgia
Superettan players
USL Championship players
USL League Two players
USL Second Division players
Veikkausliiga players